Alexander Rizzo (January 12, 1968 – May 16, 2002) was an American professional wrestler, better known by his ring name, Big Dick Dudley. Rizzo was best known for his appearances with the Philadelphia, Pennsylvania-based professional wrestling promotion Extreme Championship Wrestling from 1994 to 1999 as a member of The Dudley Brothers.

Professional wrestling career

Early career (1986–1994)
Rizzo began training with Johnny Rodz alongside the likes of Taz, Phil Theis and the Santiago Twins and became one of the first students to graduate from the now infamous school in Brooklyn. He claimed his first professional matches came in late 1986 in Puerto Rico alongside fellow Rodz students and future ECW alumni Rocco Rock and Abdullah the Butcher. He returned to the U.S. after his tour of Puerto Rico and began wrestling on the East Coast independent scene under the name of Alexander the Great. While being a monster wrestler with a great physique, Rizzo rarely became the star attraction.

NWA Eastern/Extreme Championship Wrestling (1994–1999)
Rizzo joined Eastern Championship Wrestling (ECW) in 1994. He entered just as the federation began to take off, breaking away from its National Wrestling Alliance (NWA) ties and becoming Extreme Championship Wrestling. This allowed Rizzo a chance to shine, and he took it, transforming into Big Dick Dudley, the man from Dudleyville, a creation he said was thought up between himself, Taz and Tommy Dreamer.

With his partner, Dudley Dudley, the "brothers" became a strong group in ECW, with their strong-arm antics. Big Dick became known for his powerhouse finisher, the Total Penetration, a double arm chokeslam into a tigerbomb, as well as his dangerous habit of attacking fans at ringside. Soon, the Dudley Family grew, including Buh Buh Ray, D-Von, Snot, Spike, and Dances with Dudley, creating a very dangerous family. Big Dick, being the eldest as well as the largest, formed the heart of the group, planning out attacks and leading the group. He also had to deal with brotherly problems, including feuds with D-Von and Spike.

Although Big Dick was the leader of the family, he rarely was given title shots, instead content to sit back and direct his brothers in their quests for gold. His aid to Buh Buh Ray and D-Von helped create the great tag team that was The Dudley Boyz, and his giant stature made Spike even more popular in their feud. As some of the Dudley family left, the remaining members, Buh Buh Ray and D-Von, became Tag Team Champions. They soon became top heels in the company. He also carried on an almost year-long feud with Spike, the biggest brother against the smallest, with the fans firmly on the side of the underdog. In 1999, after many disagreements with Paul Heyman over what Rizzo felt was a lack of use of his character he finally left the company. Rizzo went on record after his departure saying that he felt he never got the opportunities he deserved, going as far as saying that he felt that given the chance he could have become the top draw in the company.

Independent circuit (1999–2002)
After Big Dick left ECW he would spend time in many different organizations over the next couple of years including making his Puerto Rico return for Carlos Colon's WWC becoming a mainstay over the next few years wrestling the likes of a young Carly Colon, Abdullah the Butcher and the infamous Invader I. He had reasonable success in WWC becoming one of the bigger heels in the company but never capturing any titles possibly due to the fact that his tours tended to be reasonably frequent but brief. It was during his time in Puerto Rico that he worked in front of the biggest crowds of his career stating that some of his heel antics caused near riots during events.

In 1999 helped found the semi-popular XPW, known, like ECW, for its hardcore antics. At one point, Big Dick took home the XPW World Heavyweight Championship. He would go on to earn belts in the NWA Jersey faction and the USPW federation. But things soon began to go downhill for the senior member of the Dudleyz. In only two years, Big Dick was involved in four auto accidents, including a serious motorcycle crash that left him with a broken neck. This kept Big Dick on the sidelines of wrestling for over a year.

Personal life
Rizzo was married to fellow wrestler Donna "Elektra" Adamo, who he met while training under Johnny Rodz. The couple divorced prior to Rizzo's death in May 2002. Rizzo had a daughter (born in 1990 to Adamo) and a son (born in 1997 to a different spouse).

Death
On May 16, 2002, Rizzo was found dead in his apartment. He was 34 years old. The cause of death was kidney failure brought on by years of painkiller abuse. According to former wife Elektra on what happened the day of his death:

Championships and accomplishments
Northeastern Wrestling
NEW Heavyweight Championship (1 time)
Northern States Wrestling Alliance
NSWA Heavyweight Championship (1 time)
NWA Jersey
NWA Jersey Hardcore Championship (1 time)
NWA Jersey Heavyweight Championship (1 time)
Pro Wrestling Illustrated
PWI ranked him #200 of the 500 best singles wrestlers of the PWI 500 in 1998
USA Xtreme Wrestling
UXW Heavyweight Championship (2 times)
UXW Tag Team Championship (1 time) - with Sam Dudley 
World Wrestling Alliance
WWA Heavyweight Championship (2 times)
Xtreme Pro Wrestling
XPW World Heavyweight Championship (1 time)

See also

 Big Dick Dudley Memorial Show
 The Dudley Brothers
 List of premature professional wrestling deaths

References

External links
 

1968 births
2002 deaths
American male professional wrestlers
American professional wrestlers of Italian descent
Deaths from kidney failure
Professional wrestlers from New Jersey
The Dudley Brothers members
20th-century professional wrestlers
XPW World Heavyweight Champions